

Station List

B